Botoks is a 2017 Polish thriller film directed by Patryk Vega. It stars Olga Bołądź, Agnieszka Dygant, Katarzyna Warnke and Marieta Żukowska. It was shot in Warsaw, Paris, Copenhagen and Kenya. The title literally means "botox" in Polish.

Cast 
 Olga Bołądź as Daniela 
 Agnieszka Dygant as Beata Winkler
 Katarzyna Warnke as Magda 
 Marieta Żukowska as Patrycja Banach
 Janusz Chabior as Ordynator oddziału 
 Sebastian Fabijański as Marek  
 Piotr Stramowski as Michał 
 Tomasz Oświeciński as Darek
 Grażyna Szapołowska  
 Wojciech Machnicki
Michał Kula 
Jan Fabiańczyk
Katarzyna Czapla
Marek Krupiński
Krzysztof Gojdź

Reception

Box office
The film had the second best opening for a Polish film in 30 years (after Vega's previous film Pitbull: Dangerous women), with 711,906 admissions in its opening weekend in Poland. It totaled 2.31 million admissions (with average admission cost at €4.2) in 2017, the second highest of the year in Poland after Letters to Santa 3. In the United Kingdom, it was the third highest-grossing foreign-language film of 2017, as well as the most successful Polish film of all time in the UK, earning £1.06 million at the box office.

References

External links 

Botoks on Filmweb

Films about surgeons
Polish thriller films
2017 thriller films
2017 films